The 2021 Nagoya Mayoral Election will be held on April 25, 2021 to elect the Mayor of Nagoya, Aichi, Japan.

Overview 
The election will take place due to the expiration of the term of office of the incumbent, Takashi Kawamura (Genzei Nippon Party).

Campaigns

Election Data 

 Reason for election：Expiration of term of office
 Official Announcement: April 11, 2021
 Election Day: April 25, 2021

Candidates 
（In order of announcement）

Timeline 

 2021

 January 7th - Keiko Ogata announces intention to run.
 January 21st - Nagoya City Election Administration Commission announces April 11 as the  date for the start of the campaign and April 25 as election day.

References

External links
Municipal Information: Elections - City of Nagoya (Japanese)
Aichi Prefectural Election Administration Commission (Japanese) 

Mayoral elections in Japan
April 2021 events in Japan
Nagoya